Mount Goethe is a summit in Fresno County, California, in the United States.

It was named after the German writer Johann Wolfgang von Goethe, the author of Faust.

Mount Goethe was first climbed in 1933 by David Brower and George Rockwood.

See also
 Goethe Glacier

References

External links
 

Mountains of Fresno County, California
Mountains of the Sierra Nevada (United States)
Johann Wolfgang von Goethe
Mountains of Northern California